Chicago Avenue is a street in Chicago, Illinois, United States.

Chicago Avenue may also refer to:
Chicago Avenue (East Chicago, Indiana)
Chicago Avenue (Evanston, Illinois)
Chicago Avenue (Minneapolis)
Chicago Street (Hammond, Indiana)

See also
Chicago Road